"Roses" is a song by American producer Benny Blanco and rapper Juice Wrld featuring singer Brendon Urie of Panic! at the Disco. It debuted on Zane Lowe's show World Record on Beats 1 on December 5, 2018. Rock Sound likened its announcement to an "ambitious crossover event".

Promotion
Blanco initially posted a text exchange between himself and Juice Wrld before sharing two snippets of the song on Instagram. The following day he announced on Twitter that it would be released on December 5.

Track listing

Charts

Certifications

Release history

References

2018 singles
2018 songs
Benny Blanco songs
Juice Wrld songs
Brendon Urie songs
Song recordings produced by Benny Blanco
Song recordings produced by Cashmere Cat
Songs written by Benny Blanco
Songs written by Brendon Urie
Songs written by Cashmere Cat
Songs written by Juice Wrld
Songs written by Happy Perez